Terrycloth, terry cloth, terry cotton, terry toweling, terry, terry towel, or simply toweling is a fabric woven with many protruding loops of thread which can absorb large amounts of water. It can be manufactured by weaving or knitting. Terrycloth is woven on special looms that have two beams of longitudinal warp through which the filler or weft is fired laterally. The first industrial production of terrycloth towels  was initiated by the English manufacturer Christy in 1850. According to the Oxford English Dictionary, the word may derive from French  'drawn', past participle of  'draw out'.

About
There are two types of terry fabrics:

 Towel terry
 This is a woven fabric with long loops that can absorb large amounts of water. Its content is usually 100% cotton, but may sometimes contain polyester.
 French terry
 This is a type of fabric used in clothing. Ranging from items such as hoodies, pants and even shirts. The inside of the fabric is crossed with loops, while the outer part is smooth and flat. It can be 100% cotton or be made from a variety of fibers, sometimes with spandex (also known as elastane or lycra). It is often warp-knitted, and the term French terry is colloquially used for all warp-knitted terry.

It is the length of loops that determines how much fluid is absorbed by the cloth as longer loops provide more surface area to absorb and come in contact with the fluid.

Items that may be made from terrycloth include babies' reusable diapers (or "nappies" in UK-English), towels, bathrobes, bedlinen, and sweatbands for the wrist or head. Terrycloth is also sometimes used to make sweat-jackets. Terry-toweling hats with a shallow brim were once popular with cricketers (like English wicketkeeper Jack Russell), but are no longer in fashion.

A slow method of machine-making French terry results in a soft, sturdy variety called loopwheel. Loopwheel machines can only produce one yard an hour. It was invented in the 1920s and was at the height of its popularity in the forties and fifties, at which point it was overtaken by side-seam manufacturing. Only two factories remain.

An alternative fabric used for towels is waffle fabric. A modern synthetic alternative is microfiber.

References

General sources

External links
 

Domestic implements
Knitted fabrics
Woven fabrics